The Borsato Formation is a stratigraphic unit of Late Devonian (Frasnian) age. It is present on the western edge of the Western Canada Sedimentary Basin in the southern Rocky Mountains of Alberta and British Columbia. It consists of dolomite and was named for Mount Borsato in the Flathead Range near North Kootenay Pass by R.A. Price in 1965.

The formation is fossiliferous and includes remains of stromatoporoids and tabulate corals.

Thickness and lithology 
It was deposited in a reefal environment and consists of dark coloured, medium- to thick-bedded, medium- to coarse-crystalline dolomite.

Distribution and relationship to other units 
The Borsato Formation is present in the Rocky Mountains of southeastern British Columbia and southwestern Alberta, west of the Lewis Thrust Fault and south of about 49° 45". It overlies the Hollebeke Formation, and is overlain by the Mount Hawk Formation or the Peechee Member of the Southesk Formation, depending on the location.

References 

Geologic formations of Alberta
Geologic formations of British Columbia
Devonian Alberta
Devonian British Columbia
Frasnian Stage
Dolomite formations
Reef deposits
Western Canadian Sedimentary Basin
Fossiliferous stratigraphic units of North America
Paleontology in Alberta